Todd Martin defeated David Wheaton 6–3, 6–4 to win the 1993 International Tennis Championships singles event.

Seeds

  Wally Masur (semifinals)
  David Wheaton (finalist)
  Todd Martin (champion)'''
  Richey Reneberg (second round)  Jonathan Stark (second round)  Luis Herrera (second round)  Derrick Rostagno (first round)  Jeff Tarango (second round)''

Draw

Finals

Section 1

Section 2

External links
 Main Draw

International Tennis Championships – Singles, 1993
Delray Beach Open